was a Japanese politician who served two terms in the House of Representatives.

Early life
Born in Osaka as the son of House of Representatives member Jinichirō Maeda.

Education
Maeda graduated in 1969 from the Engineering Department of Osaka University.

Career
After serving as promotions director of the Osaka branch of the LDP, he was elected to the Diet in the 39th general election on an LDP ticket, and joined the Kōmoto Faction. In the 1993 general election he failed to be reelected, but managed to be reelected on a New Frontier Party ticket in the 1996 general election. In 1998, he joined the so-called Reform Club led by Ichiro Ozawa. In 1999, he became Parliamentary Vice-Minister in the Ministry of Posts and Telecommunications, a post he also had in the Second Obuchi Cabinet and in the First Mori Cabinet.

Death
He died on October 28, 2013, in Osaka from heart failure.

References

1946 births
2013 deaths
Liberal Democratic Party (Japan) politicians
Members of the House of Representatives (Japan)
Kansai University alumni
People from Osaka
Osaka University alumni